The Glasgow Evening News was an important Scottish newspaper in the early 20th century. It was founded as the Glasgow Evening Post in 1866 and became the Evening News in 1915.

Neil Munro was editor for a time and his Para Handy stories were first published in the newspaper.

The newspaper closed in January 1957.

References 

Newspapers published in Scotland
Defunct newspapers published in the United Kingdom